"If There's Any Justice" is the first single taken from British R&B singer Lemar's second album, Time to Grow (2004). Originally offered to Hear'Say, the song was rejected by the group after they decided it was "too mature" for them. It would eventually become a top-10 hit for Lemar, peaking at  3 on the UK Singles Chart, his fourth in a row to reach the top 10. Outside the UK, the song reached No. 1 in Hungary and entered the top 40 in France, Ireland, and New Zealand.

Lyrical content
The lyrics refer to Lemar being in love with a girl who already has a man. He claims that if he had met her first, he would be her man instead. He is making it clear in the song that he feels that there is no justice in the world because of this fact.

Cover versions
Dutch singer Floortje Smit covered the song—retitled "Justice"—for her debut album "Fearless". James Blunt performed an acoustic version of the song on BBC Radio 1's Live Lounge (part of Jo Wiley's show), later released on the compilation album "Radio 1's Live Lounge".

Track listings
 UK CD1
 "If There's Any Justice" (radio edit) – 3:29
 "If There's Any Justice" (Ron G remix featuring Cassidy) – 3:55

 UK CD2
 "If There's Any Justice" (album version) – 3:49
 "If There's Any Justice" (5am remix featuring Cassidy) – 3:34
 "All I Ever Do/My Boo (Part II)" – 4:12
 "If There's Any Justice" (video) – 3:49

 UK 12-inch vinyl
A1. "If There's Any Justice" (Kardinal Beats remix featuring Cassidy) – 3:34
A2. "If There's Any Justice" (Ron G remix featuring Cassidy) – 3:53
A3. "If There's Any Justice" (Cutfather & Joe remix featuring Cassidy) – 3:17
B1. "If There's Any Justice" (5am remix featuring Cassidy) – 3:34
B2. "If There's Any Justice" (First Man remix) – 3:30
B3. "If There's Any Justice" (accapella) – 3:40

Charts and certifications

Weekly charts

Year-end charts

Certifications

References

2004 singles
2004 songs
Lemar songs
Number-one singles in Hungary
Songs written by Mick Leeson
Songs written by Peter Vale
Sony Music UK singles